Farmington is an unincorporated community and census-designated place (CDP) in Graves County, Kentucky, United States. The population of Farmington was 245 at the 2010 census.

Farmington was laid out in 1836 and named for the fertile land and rustic setting.

Farmington was home to Farmington High School until 1986 when the six remaining high schools of the county combined to form Graves County High School. Farmington Elementary School is located near central Farmington. Farmington Elementary School is ranked among the highest in the state, receiving a National Blue Ribbon award in 2007. Farmington Elementary School spends $4,477 per student; the average school expenditure in the U.S. is $6,058. There are about 18 students per teacher in Farmington.

Demographics

References

Census-designated places in Graves County, Kentucky
Census-designated places in Kentucky